Kim Hak-min (Hangul: 김학민; born ) is a South Korean male volleyball player. He currently plays for the Uijeongbu KB Insurance Stars.

References

External links
 profile at FIVB.org

1983 births
Living people
South Korean men's volleyball players
People from Suwon
Asian Games medalists in volleyball
Volleyball players at the 2010 Asian Games
Medalists at the 2010 Asian Games
Asian Games bronze medalists for South Korea
Sportspeople from Gyeonggi Province
21st-century South Korean people